Le Miracle des loups is a French historical drama film from 1924, directed by Raymond Bernard, written by André-Paul Antoine, starring Jean-Emile Vanni-Marcoux. The scenario was based on a novel of Henry Dupuis-Mazuel "Le miracle des loups", published in 1924.

Numerous scenes were filmed at the Cité de Carcassonne with thousands of participants. It was also filmed in Château de Pierrefonds, Col de Porte, Isère, Le Sappey-en-Chartreuse, and in studio.

Raymond Bernard was a director, screenwriter, and actor. It was a debut for Marie Glory (uncredited).

Plot 
The narrative takes place in the 15th century, when Louis XI was at odds with Charles of Burgundy. The king's forces are attacked by the Burgundian troops and Beauvais must be defended until reinforcements can arrive. The defence of the city is led by Jeanne Hachette. There are realistic scenes in which wolves attack some of the opponents of Louis XI.

Production and distribution 
The film was produced by the Société des Films Historiques (Henri Dupuy-Mazuel) and distributed by the Société des Etablissements L. Gaumont. The première was at the Paris Opéra and was attended by the President of France, the Premier and many other distinguished persons.

In the USA it was distributed under the title The Miracle of the Wolves and in Germany under the title Das Wunder der Wölfe. In Spain it was known as El milagro de los lobos, and in Italy as Il Miracolo dei lupi.

In 1930 a sound version was produced.

In 1961 another film was produced with the same scenario and the same title (directed by André Hunebelle).

Reception 
The film was recognised as a French equivalent of the American The Birth of a Nation (1915).

The film turned its eye on a moment of French glory, the late 15th century, when a sense of national unity had yet to be forged. In France it was the most popular film of 1924. It was highly praised by the intelligentsia in France, for its realism, but it was derisively treated by American critics. Later it was claimed as a spectacular production. It has a reputation as one of the highpoints of French silent cinema. It belongs to the best French tradition.

Cast 
 Jean-Emile Vanni-Marcoux: Charles le Téméraire
 Charles Dullin: Le roi Louis XI
 Yvonne Sergyl: Jeanne Fouquet, future Jeanne Hachette
 Romuald Joubé: Le chevalier Robert Cottereau
 Armand Bernard: Bische
 Ernest Maupain: Fouquet
 Fernand Mailly: Philippe Le Bon
 Gaston Modot: Le comte du Lau, sire de Châteauneuf
 Philippe Hériat: Tristan l'Ermite
 Raymond Bernard: Le joueur d'échec
 Albert Préjean: Un soldat
 Robert Guilbert: Le duc de Bourbon
 Pierre Denols: Coitier
 Émilien Richard: Commines
 Halma: Olivier le Daim
 Maud Richard: (uncredited)

References

External links 
 Le Miracle des loups (1924) at the Films de France 
 Das Wunder der Wölfe at Filmkultur 
 "« Le Miracle des Loups », histoire d’une restauration" at centrimage.com 

1924 films
1920s adventure drama films
1920s historical films
French adventure drama films
French epic films
French historical films
French silent feature films
1920s French-language films
Films directed by Raymond Bernard
Films based on French novels
Films set in the 15th century
Films set in France
French black-and-white films
Cultural depictions of Charles the Bold
Cultural depictions of Louis XI of France
1924 drama films
Silent drama films
Silent adventure films
1920s French films